Köllnische Heide is a railway station in the Neukölln district of Berlin.

References

Berlin S-Bahn stations
Buildings and structures in Neukölln
Railway stations in Germany opened in 1920
Railway stations closed in 1980
Railway stations in Germany opened in 1993